Elio Mora (born 14 January 1977 in Asunción, Paraguay) is a Paraguayan footballer currently playing for Deportivo Santaní of the División Intermedia in Paraguay.

Teams
  General Caballero 2003-2004
  Deportes Puerto Montt 2004
  Tacuary 2005
  General Caballero 2005-2008
  Sport Colombia 2009-2010
  Deportivo Santaní 2011–present

External links
 
 

1977 births
Living people
Paraguayan footballers
Paraguayan expatriate footballers
Puerto Montt footballers
Club Tacuary footballers
Sport Colombia footballers
General Caballero Sport Club footballers
Chilean Primera División players
Expatriate footballers in Chile
Association footballers not categorized by position